You Better Move On is a country album by Billy "Crash" Craddock. It was originally released in 1972 on Cartwheel Records. It reached No. 18 on Record Worlds Country Album Chart and No. 37 on Billboards Hot Country LPs chart. It was reissued in 1973 on ABC Records.

Track listing
"You Better Move On" (Arthur Alexander)
"What He Don't Know Won't Hurt Him" (Craddock)
"Seventh Son" (Willie Dixon)
"Jeanie Norman" (Craddock)
"The Fool" (Craddock)
"Dream Lover" (Bobby Darin)
"She Could" (Craddock)
"Til Morning" (Craddock)
"She's My Angel" (Craddock)
"Treat Her Right" (Roy Head)

References

Billy "Crash" Craddock albums
1972 albums